The Nyabwa (Niaboua, Niédéboua, Nyaboa, Nyabwa-Nyédébwa, Nyedebwa or Nyaboa) language is a Kru language spoken in Ivory Coast. It is part of the Wee dialect continuum.

Writing system

Nasalisation is indicated by a tilde on the vowel. Tones are indicated by following signs:
Very high tone is indicated by a double apostrophe ‹ ˮ › ;
High tone is indicated by an apostrophe ‹ ʼ › ;
Mid-tone is indicated by no diacritic;
Low tone is indicated by a hyphen ‹ ˗ ›.

References

Wee languages
Languages of Ivory Coast